The Zum Friedefürsten Church is a baroque Lutheran round church in Klingenthal, Saxony, south-eastern Germany. It has an octagonal floorplan and is the largest of its kind in Saxony. The church is the most important historical monument in Klingenthal and dominates the town centre. The church was officially finished in 1737.

References 

Klingenthal
Klingenthal
Klingenthal
Octagonal churches
Buildings and structures in Vogtlandkreis